Clorinde was a 40-gun  of the French Navy, designed by Sané. The British Royal Navy captured her in 1814 and renamed her HMS Aurora. After 19 years as a coal hulk she was broken up in 1851.

French frigate
From June 1809, she was stationed with the 16-gun  and the 38-gun . In September, she sailed with Renommée, Loire, and Seine to Guadeloupe. 

On 13 December, she and Renommée captured .

On 15 December 1809, Clorinde ran aground, and freed herself by dropping guns and ammunition overboard.

She took part in the action of 20 May 1811, fought off Madagascar, and returned to Brest. Captain Jacques Saint-Cricq was found guilty of failing to properly support his commodore. Saint-Cricq was demoted of rank, expelled from the Legion of Honour, and sentenced to three years in prison.

On 6 December 1813, Clorinde captured the British merchant vessel  in the Atlantic Ocean. Lusitania, Johnston, master, had been sailing from London to Suriname. Clorinde then put the crews of four other vessels that she had captured aboard Lusitania and sent her into Plymouth. The other four were:
 , of 473 tons (bm), Barr, master, which had been sailing from London to Bermuda;
 , of 426 tons (bm), P. Inglis, master, which had been sailing from London to Martinique;
 Aurora, Scheidt, master, which had been sailing to Amelia Island; and,
 Superb, R. Roberts, of 130 tons (bm), which had been sailing from Gibraltar to England.
Clorinde abandoned Blenden Hall at sea, where the Falmouth packet Eliza, homeward bound from Malta, found her floating.  brought Blenden Hall into Plymouth. They arrived on 19 December, on the same day as Lusitania.

Although Captain Denis Lagarde, flew Portuguese colours in an attempt to trick Cock, Cock surmised that the frigate was French, not Portuguese, and threw his mails overboard before the Frenchmen boarded Townshend. Clorinde sank Townshend.

A violent fight ensued for two hours and 20 minutes that left both ships dismasted, Eurotas suffering 20 killed and 30 wounded (including Captain John Phillimore), and Clorinde, 40 killed and 80 wounded. During the night, the ships built jury rigs and resumed the pursuit the next day, when  and  intervened. The helpless Clorinde struck after the first cannon shot from Dryad, which towed Clorinde into Portsmouth.

British frigate
Clorinde was brought into British service as HMS Aurora. She served off South America during the years 1821–25, and in the Caribbean, 1826–28.

Fate
From January 1832, she was used as a coal hulk in Falmouth. She was eventually broken up in May 1851.

Notes, citations, and references
Notes

Citations

References
 
 

Age of Sail frigates of France
Pallas-class frigates (1808)
Ships built in France
1808 ships
Coal hulks